Granville Road is a street in Tsim Sha Tsui, Hong Kong.

Location

The street consists of two sections: a western section running between Nathan Road and Chatham Road South, which runs almost parallel to Kimberley Road, Cameron Road and Kimberley Street. This section was built in the late 19th century. The eastern section runs between Chatham Road and Science Museum Road, which was built by extending the original western portion to Tsim Sha Tsui East via reclamation. A public square called Granville Square in Tsim Sha Tsui East was named after the road.

Name 
The Road first appeared on the Rates List for 1896/7. It was named after Granville Leveson-Gower, 2nd Earl Granville, who was a Secretary of State for the Colonies from 1868 to 1870 and in 1886.

Landmarks 
Two of Hong Kong's main public museums, Hong Kong Museum of History and Hong Kong Science Museum, are located on the eastern stretch of Granville Road. Kowloon Park is located towards the western end of Granville Road.

Shopping centre The ONE, and its predecessor Tung Ying Building, are located on the corner between Granville Road and Nathan Road. The private gallery Hong Kong 3D Museum is in Hilton Place on the eastern stretch of Granville Road.

Shopping
The area east of Nathan Road, comprising Cameron Road, Granville Road and Carnarvon Road has been described as having "teeming shops" and likely the main reason that Hong Kong acquired the "shopping paradise" tag, a phrase first put into print in an ironic manner by author Han Suyin, in her 1952 novel A Many-Splendoured Thing.

See also
 List of streets and roads in Hong Kong

References 

 

Roads in Kowloon
Tsim Sha Tsui